Fareham Community Hospital is a healthcare facility at Brook Lane in Sarisbury, Hampshire, England. It is managed by the Southern Health NHS Foundation Trust.

History
The facility was procured under a Private Finance Initiative contract in 2007. It was built by Morgan Sindall at a cost of £10 million and opened in 2010. In 2018 it was estimated that its rooms were only being used 40% of each day and, as such, the hospital was not being used to its full potential.

References

External links 
 
 Fareham Community Hospital on the NHS website

Southern Health NHS Foundation Trust
Hospital buildings completed in 2010
2010 establishments in England
Hospitals established in 2010
Hospitals in Hampshire
NHS hospitals in England
Fareham